Boder may refer to:

People
 David P. Boder (1886–1961), Latvian-American professor of psychology
 Gerd Boder (1933–1992), German composer
 Michael Boder (born 1958), German conductor

Places
 , Germany